Frank Owen III (February 25, 1926 – February 20, 1999) was a Texas legislator.

Born in El Paso, Texas, Owen served in the Texas House of Representatives from 1951 to 1955 and in the Texas State Senate from 1955 to 1965.

References
 Texas House of Representatives resolution honoring Frank Owen III

1926 births
1999 deaths
Members of the Texas House of Representatives
Texas state senators
20th-century American politicians